Vytautas Kevin Gerulaitis (July 26, 1954 – September 17, 1994) was an American professional tennis player, known as Vitas Gerulaitis. In 1975, he won the men's doubles title at Wimbledon, partnering with Sandy Mayer. He won the men's singles title at one of the two Australian Open tournaments held in 1977. (Gerulaitis won the tournament that was held in December, while Roscoe Tanner won the earlier January tournament.) He won two Italian Open titles, in 1977 and 1979, and the WCT Finals in Dallas in 1978.

Early life
Gerulaitis was born on July 26, 1954, in Brooklyn, New York, to Lithuanian immigrant parents, and grew up in Howard Beach, Queens. He attended Archbishop Molloy High School in Queens, graduating in 1971. He attended Columbia College of Columbia University with the class of 1975 for one year before dropping out to pursue tennis full-time. Gerulaitis was nicknamed "The Lithuanian Lion". His younger sister Ruta was also a professional tennis player.  Both siblings' native language was Lithuanian.

Career highlights
Gerulaitis led the Pittsburgh Triangles to the World TeamTennis championship title at Pittsburgh's Civic Arena in 1975. Gerulaitis played for the Triangles from 1974 until 1976. He also played for the league's Indiana Loves franchise in 1977.

Gerulaitis was coached by Fred Stolle from 1977 until 1983.

He also won the men's doubles title at Wimbledon in 1975. He was a singles semifinalist at Wimbledon in both 1977 and 1978. In 1977 he lost a Wimbledon semifinal to his close friend and practice partner, Björn Borg, 6–4, 3–6, 6–3, 3–6, 8–6, a match later considered one of the greatest of the decade.

In 1977, Gerulaitis won the most significant title of his career at the Australian Open, when he defeated John Lloyd in the men's singles final in five sets.

In 1978, Gerulaitis won the year-end championship WCT Finals for the World Championship Tennis tour, beating Eddie Dibbs 6–3, 6–2, 6–1. By 1978, he was the third-ranked men's singles player in the world.

In 1979, Gerulaitis lost in the men's singles finals at the US Open to fellow New Yorker, John McEnroe, in straight sets. He was a member of the United States team which won the Davis Cup in 1979. He won two singles "rubbers" in the final, as the US beat Italy 5–0.

Gerulaitis reached his third Grand Slam singles final in 1980, when he lost in the final of the French Open to Björn Borg in straight sets.

In February 1981, Gerulaitis won the star-laden Toronto Indoor invitational tournament, defeating John McEnroe in the final after having defeated Jimmy Connors in the semifinal.

During his career, Gerulaitis won 25 top-level singles titles and eight doubles titles. His career-high singles ranking was world No. 3 which he reached on February 27, 1978.

Gerulaitis was known for his exceptionally quick hands at the net and his outstanding court coverage.
In 1985, Gerulaitis teamed with Bobby Riggs to launch a challenge to female players after the famous Battle of the Sexes. The stunt, however, was short-lived when Gerulaitis and Riggs lost a doubles match against Martina Navratilova and Pam Shriver.

He retired from the professional tour in 1986, and was a regular tennis commentator on the USA network between 1988 and 1994.

Gerulaitis coached Pete Sampras during the 1994 Italian Open in Rome, when Sampras' coach, Tim Gullikson, was on a family vacation. Sampras won the title by defeating Boris Becker in the final in straight sets.

Death
On September 17, 1994, while visiting a friend's home in Southampton, New York, an improperly installed pool heater caused carbon monoxide gas to seep into the guesthouse where Gerulaitis was sleeping, causing his death by carbon monoxide poisoning. Gerulaitis failed to show up for a dinner at 7 p.m. that evening and his body was found the following day by a maid who went to the guesthouse. Gerulaitis' remains were interred in Saint Charles Cemetery in Farmingdale, New York.

Criminal charges of negligent homicide were later brought against the pool mechanic and the company he worked for. Both he and the company were acquitted in October 1996. Jurors heard testimony that a technician from the heater manufacturer had made adjustments several days before Gerulaitis' death and that even if an exhaust pipe had been longer, carbon monoxide (colorless and odorless) would have still been drawn into the air-conditioning vent because it is denser than air at low temperatures. Arthur M. Luxenberg, a lawyer for the Gerulaitis family, stated that Gerulaitis' mother and sister believed the verdict to be fair, and he went on to state that the testimony at the trial "confirmed to us what we always knew: that there were a lot of other people involved in this matter."

The Gerulaitis family reached a confidential settlement with some of the defendants in their civil case by 2002.

Grand Slam finals

Singles: 3 (1 title, 2 runner-ups)

Singles performance timeline

Career finals

Singles: 56 (26 titles, 30 runner-ups)

Doubles: 21 (9–12)

Commemoration
The Vitas Gerulaitis Memorial Tennis Centre was opened in Vilnius, the capital of Lithuania. Also, a street in Vilnius is named after him. The song An Outbreak of Vitas Gerulaitis by Birkenhead band Half Man Half Biscuit, from their 1991 album McIntyre, Treadmore and Davitt also references the player, albeit obliquely.

Quote

"And let that be a lesson to you all. Nobody beats Vitas Gerulaitis 17 times in a row."
 – after defeating Jimmy Connors at the January 1980 Masters.

References

Video
 Wimbledon Classic Match: Gerulaitis vs Borg Standing Room Only, DVD Release Date: October 31, 2006, Run Time: 180 minutes, .

External links
 
 
 
 

1954 births
1994 deaths
Accidental deaths in New York (state)
American male tennis players
American people of Lithuanian descent
Archbishop Molloy High School alumni
Australian Open (tennis) champions
Burials at Saint Charles Cemetery
Columbia Lions men's tennis players
Deaths from carbon monoxide poisoning
Grand Slam (tennis) champions in men's singles
Grand Slam (tennis) champions in men's doubles
Lithuanian male tennis players
Sportspeople from Brooklyn
Sportspeople from Queens, New York
Tennis people from New York (state)
Wimbledon champions
People from Howard Beach, Queens
Columbia College (New York) alumni